Jean Elliot (April 1727 – 29 March 1805), also known as Jane Elliot, was a Scottish poet. She wrote one of the most famous versions of The Flowers of the Forest, a song lamenting the Scottish army's defeat in the Battle of Flodden.  Published in 1776, it is her only surviving work. The lyrics are set to an earlier tune c. 1615–1625 in the John Skene of Halyards Manuscript as "Flowres of the Forrest."

Biography 

Daughter of Sir Gilbert Elliot, Jean was born in 1727 at Minto House in Teviotdale.

During the Jacobite rising of 1745, when a party of Jacobites came to arrest her influential father, Jean received and entertained the unwelcomed officers at Minto House with such calmness, courtesy and composure that she was able to convince them that her father was not within reach when he was actually hiding himself among Minto crags, not far from the Minto House.

While Miss Elliot had many admirers, she never married. From 1782 to 1804 she resided in Brown's Square, Edinburgh. She is said to have been the last lady in the city who kept standing in her hall a private sedan chair.

Towards the end of her life, Jean went back to Teviotdale. She died either at Minto House, or Mount Teviot, the residence of her younger brother Admiral John Elliot, on 29 March 1805.

Her brothers included Gilbert, John, and Andrew Elliot.

References

External links 
"Women in History of Scots Descent: Song Writers", ElectricScotland.com
"Abbotsford Series of the Scottish Poets Volume 1 by George Eyre-Todd", Google Books

1727 births
1805 deaths
Scottish women poets
Scottish women writers
18th-century Scottish women writers
Daughters of baronets